was an Empress consort of Japan. She was the empress consort of her paternal uncle Emperor Junna.

She became empress in 827. Her husband abdicated in 833. Either when she was widowed in 840, or when her son was deposed as crown prince in 842, Seishi followed the example of her mother and became a nun: she retired to the palace of her late spouse, Junna'in, which she made in to a family convent, engaging in sponsoring lectures of the Lotus Sutra and providing care for orphans.

Notes

Japanese princesses
Japanese empresses
Japanese Buddhist nuns
9th-century Buddhist nuns
810 births
879 deaths
9th-century Japanese women
Daughters of emperors